Sadozai, also spelt Sudhozai, Sudhazai, and in other ways, may refer to:

 Sardar abdullah khan saddozai was the ruler of dera ismail khan in the year of 1840s.
 sardar ghulam sarwar khan and sardar ishaq khan were the sons of sardar abdullah khan saddozai and were the SARDAR OF SADDOZAI TRIBE.
 The grand son of saddozai rulers,Sardar abdul-rehman khan is the SARDAR OF SADDOZAI TRIBE in dera ismail khan,pakistan.

 Sadozai (Pashtun tribe), a major tribe from Afghanistan and Pakistan.
 Sadozai Kingdom, a name for the Durrani Empire
 Dera Sadozai, a name for Sudhan Gali in Azad Kashmir, Pakistan
 Sadozai dynasty, was founded in 1747 by Ahmad Shah Durrani at Kandahar and created the Sadozai Kingdom.
Sadozai (Azad Kashmir ethnic group), also spelt "Sudhozai", in other ways, second name for Sudhan tribe a major ethnic Pashtuns from Rawalakot, Pulandari in Azad Kashmir.
Sadozai Sultanate of Herat,  was a state in Herat founded in 1716 when Sadozai Pashtuns Safavid forces from the province.